Gabriel Halabrín (born 21 April 2003) is a Slovak footballer who plays for MFK Ružomberok as a midfielder.

Club career

FK Senica
A product of local academy, Halabrín made his professional Fortuna Liga debut for Senica against Ružomberok on 24 July 2021.

MFK Ružomberok
Ahead of the 2022–23 season, Halabrín signed a 4-year deal with MFK Ružomberok.

References

External links
 Futbalnet profile 
 
 

2003 births
Living people
Sportspeople from Skalica
Slovak footballers
Slovakia youth international footballers
Association football midfielders
FK Senica players
MFK Ružomberok players
Slovak Super Liga players